The Devil's Laughter is a 1953 historical adventure novel by the American writer Frank Yerby. One reviewer described it as having "more dazzle than depth". It is set in Europe of the late eighteenth century in contrast to Yerby's more usual setting of nineteenth century America.

Synopsis
Jean Paul Marin, the son of a wealthy merchant father is committed to wronging the injustices of French aristocracy and monarchy and becomes a leader of the developing French Revolution. He also becomes romantically involved with three very different woman.

References

Bibliography
 Bonner Jr., John W. Bibliography of Georgia Authors, 1949-1965. University of Georgia Press, 2010.
 Hill, James Lee. Anti-heroic Perspectives: The Life and Works of Frank Yerby. University of Iowa, 1976. 

1953 American novels
American historical novels
Novels by Frank Yerby
Dial Press books
Novels set in the 18th century
Novels set in Paris
Novels set in the French Revolution